Collison and Collisson are surnames. Notable people with the surnames include:

C. N. Collison (1845–1929), South Australian journalist, and land and patent agent
Darren Collison (born 1987), American basketball player
Frank Collison (born 1950), American actor
George Collison (1772–1847), English Congregationalist and educator
Harold Collison (1909–1995), British trade unionist
Jack Collison (born 1988), Welsh footballer
James Collisson (1875–1962), politician in Alberta, Canada
John Collison (born 1990), Irish entrepreneur
Levi Collison (1875–1965), English art publisher and printer, MP
M. Chave Collisson (1887–1982), Australian feminist
Nick Collison (born 1980), American basketball player
Patrick Collison (born 1988), Irish entrepreneur
R. K. Collisson (1857–1932), Anglican minister in South Australia, father of M. Chave Collisson
William Henry Collison (1847–1922), Anglican missionary
Wilson Collison (1893–1941), author and playwright

See also
Collinson
Cullison (surname)

English-language surnames
Patronymic surnames
Surnames from given names